Carnoux-en-Provence, commonly referred to simply as Carnoux, is a commune in the Bouches-du-Rhône department in the Provence-Alpes-Côte d'Azur region in Southern France. It was created in 1966 from the commune of Roquefort-la-Bédoule. In 2018, Carnoux-en-Provence had a population of 6,564.

Carnoux-de-Provence is located 16.3 km (10.3 mi) to the east-southeast of Marseille. Camp de Carpiagne, the garrison for the 1st Foreign Cavalry Regiment and formerly 1st-11th Cuirassier armoured (tank) regiment of the French Army, is found in the town's western part, as well as with territory in the 9th arrondissement of Marseille, Aubagne and Cassis, north of the renowned road from Marseille to Cassis.

History 
In 1957, French citizens repatriated from Morocco established the town of Carnoux on the land of Roquefort-la-Bédoule, where those repatriated from Algeria were also welcomed from 1962.

In 1966, the commune of Carnoux-en-Provence was officially created, becoming the 119th commune in Bouches-du-Rhône. The city's urban and municipal policies were developed by French architect Jean Rozan (1887–1977).

Population
Population development since 1968:

Geography

Situation
Carnoux-en-Provence is situated to the east of Marseille, with Aubagne to the north and Cassis to the south, with hills to the east extending to the Massif de Saint-Cyr.

Climat
Carnoux-en-Provence benefits from a Mediterranean weather.

Adjacent towns
 Aubagne to the north and west;
 Cassis to the south;
 Roquefort-la-Bédoule to the southeast and east.

List of mayors

See also
Communes of the Bouches-du-Rhône department

References

Communes of Bouches-du-Rhône
Bouches-du-Rhône communes articles needing translation from French Wikipedia